The Israel Gymnastics Federation (איגוד ההתעמלות בישראל) is the national governing body for gymnastics in Israel.

The federation was founded in 1995, and is a not-for-profit organization. It promotes all types of gymnastics in Israel. 

Its headquarters are at 2 Shitrit Street, Hadar Yosef, Tel Aviv, in Israel. The Federation's President/Chairman is Ziona Haris, its Secretary General/CEO is Sarit Shenar, and its President is Kineret Tzedef (Gancharski). 

The Federation is a member of Fédération Internationale de Gymnastique (FIG), and of the European Union of Gymnastics (UEG).

References

External links

National members of the European Gymnastics
Sports organizations established in 1995
Gymnastics in Israel
Non-profit organizations based in Israel
Gymnastics